Usharal (Üşaral) is a town in the Alakol District of Almaty Region in south-eastern Kazakhstan. It is the capital of the district. Population:

Climate

References

Populated places in Almaty Region